Robert Elwood Levitt (November 1, 1926 – September 9, 1998) was a member of the Ohio House of Representatives.

References

1926 births
Republican Party members of the Ohio House of Representatives
1998 deaths
20th-century American politicians